Pierre Brochand (born 4 July 1941, in Cannes) is a former director of the French Directorate-General for External Security (DGSE).  He was previously a diplomat.  He was a witness to Operation Frequent Wind and the Fall of Saigon in April 1975 at the end of the Vietnam War.

Alumnus of the École nationale d'administration (ENA), he is also a graduate of the École des Hautes Études Commerciales (HEC).

Career
 central administration, 1968–1971
 First Secretary in Saigon, 1971–1973
 Counsellor in Saigon, 1973–1975
 Counsellor in Bangkok, 1975–1979
 Consul General in San Francisco, 1979–1982
 Deputy Director (Asia and Oceania), 1982–1985
 Deputy Permanent Representative of France to the United Nations in New York, 1985–1989
 French Ambassador to Hungary, 1989–1993
 French Ambassador in Israel, 1993–1995
 Director General cultural, scientific and technical, 1995–1998
 Diplomatic Adviser to the Government
 French Ambassador to Portugal, 1998–2002
 Director of the DGSE, 2002-2008

Family
He is the brother of Bernard Brochand, currently UMP deputy-mayor of Cannes. Pierre Brochand is married with three children. He is a Chevalier of the Legion of Honour and Officer of the Order of Merit.

References

1941 births
Living people
French spies
Directors of the Directorate-General for External Security
Ambassadors of France to Israel
Ambassadors of France to Hungary
Ambassadors of France to Portugal
Commanders of the Ordre national du Mérite
HEC Paris alumni
École nationale d'administration alumni
Officiers of the Légion d'honneur